Pyrmont  may refer to:

 Bad Pyrmont, a spa town in northern Germany
 Pyrmont, Indiana, United States
 Pyrmont, Missouri, United States
 Pyrmont, New South Wales, a suburb of Sydney, Australia
 Pyrmont Bridge, a landmark connecting Pyrmont to Sydney in Australia
 Pyrmont, Ohio, United States
 Pyrmont, Albany, a heritage listed building in Western Australia